Crash – Cop's Daughter is a 1989 drama film directed by Mikhail Tumanishvili.

Plot
Valeria is a delinquent schoolgirl nicknamed "Crash", whose father, Aleksei Nikolaev, is a senior police lieutenant. Nikolayev has divided loyalties: on the one hand he has to arrest punks like Crash, while on the other he has to pick up his daughter from the police department where she, along with other representatives of youth subculture, has been brought in for public order violations. The conflict between father and daughter is set against the backdrop of the dissolution of the Soviet Union, when even schoolteachers cannot explain to their students why what they say changes every day.

Crash's wild life, which includes staying out all night and self-harm, culminates in a gang rape by a group of rich young men. This tragedy brings father and daughter closer together. Nikolayev subsequently sets out to take revenge on the perpetrators, defying the law which he has spent his life defending. The thugs die in a car accident. Nikolayev is promptly arrested by his colleagues, and Valeria asks for her father's forgiveness.

Cast
Oksana Arbuzova – Valeria Nikolayeva, "Crash"
Vladimir Ilyin – Aleksei Nikolayev, Valeria's father  
Anastasia Voznesenskaya – Vera Nikolayeva, Valeria's mother
Nikolai Pastukhov – Valeria's grandfather
Boris Romanov – Andrei Olegovich
Oleg Tsaryov – Operator, a guy from the white fiver (VAZ-2105 car)
Igor Nefyodov – Bald, a guy from the white fiver
Sergei Vorobiev – Bob, the driver of the white fiver
Yuri Shumilo – Alik, a guy from the white fiver
Lyubov Sokolova – Julia Nikolaevna, history teacher
Alexander Potapov – Nikolai, police sergeant
Vladimir Basov, Jr. – a pimp
Alexander Zaldostanov – biker

Shooting 
The lead role in the film was initially offered to Natalya Murashkevich, star of the TV series Guest from the Future (1985). However, after reading the script, she declined it, saying she did not want to sully the clean-cut image of her earlier character, Alisa Selezneva.

References

External links

Mosfilm films
Rape and revenge films
1980s teen drama films
Russian teen drama films
Outlaw biker films
Films directed by Mikhail Tumanishvili
1989 crime drama films
1989 films
Soviet teen drama films
Soviet crime drama films